Water Ski at the 2014 South American Games in Santiago was held from March 7 to March 9.

Medal summary

Medal table

Men

Women

References

Water skiing
2014
Central